Carsten Keuler (born 30 August 1971 in Witten) is a German former football player. He spent two seasons in the Bundesliga with 1. FC Köln.

References

External links
 

1971 births
Living people
People from Witten
Sportspeople from Arnsberg (region)
German footballers
Germany under-21 international footballers
1. FC Köln players
1. FC Köln II players
SG Wattenscheid 09 players
1. FC Nürnberg players
SpVgg Unterhaching players
Stuttgarter Kickers players
SSV Jahn Regensburg players
SV Wehen Wiesbaden players
Bundesliga players
2. Bundesliga players
Association football defenders
Footballers from North Rhine-Westphalia